Kristin is a popular female name in Scandinavia, English-speaking nations, Dutch-speaking countries, and in German-speaking countries. It is a Scandinavian variant of Christina or Christine. It is also a variation of Christine. It was the seventh most popular first name for girls born in Iceland between 2000 and 2004.

People
Kristin Bass, United States Air Force officer
Kristin Booth, Canadian actress
Kristin Chenoweth, American singer, actress
Kristin Davis, American actress
Kristín Eiríksdóttir, Icelandic poet and writer
Kristin Fairlie, Canadian actress
Kristin Gore, American writer
Kristín Halldórsdóttir, Icelandic politician and journalist
Kristin Hannah, American author
Kristin Kassner, American politician
Kristin Kreuk, Canadian actress
Kristin Mellem (born 1965, Norwegian musician
Kristin Rossum, American murderer and former toxicologist
Kristin Scott Thomas, English actress
Kristin Sigurdsdatter (ca. 1125-1178), Norwegian princess
Kristin Bauer van Straten, American actress

Other 
Kristin Lavransdatter, a character in the trilogy of historical novels of the same name by Sigrid Undset
Officer Kristin D'Silva, an army officer in Child's Play 3

See also 
Christen (disambiguation)
Christin, a given name
Kristina (disambiguation)
Kristen (given name)
Kirsten (given name)

Notes

Feminine given names
Scandinavian feminine given names
Swiss feminine given names
Dutch feminine given names
Swedish feminine given names
Norwegian feminine given names
Icelandic feminine given names
Danish feminine given names
Finnish feminine given names
English feminine given names